Black Crow (Jesse Black Crow) is a fictional Native American superhero appearing in American comic books published by Marvel Comics.

Publication history
The Black Crow first appeared in Captain America #292 (April 1984) and was created by the writer J. M. DeMatteis and penciller Paul Neary.

Fictional character biography
Jesse Black Crow, a member of the Navajo Nation, was taught the traditional ways by his great-grandfather, who was a healer. Jesse left his New Mexico reservation at the age of sixteen, after his grandfather’s death, and moved to New York City, eventually becoming a construction worker on skyscrapers. One day, while working 20 stories up, the scaffolding gave way and Jesse plunged to the ground. He survived the fall but was permanently paralyzed from the waist down. Comatose in the hospital, Jesse received a vision from the spirit of the Earth showing him the plight of the Native American people. When needed, the spirit transformed Jesse into Black Crow, a mystical warrior, and protector of his people. But Jesse does not know that his body is being used as the host for the Black Crow entity. When Jesse transforms into Black Crow, he is merely an unconscious passenger left with only vague recollections that seem delusional to Jesse, and he thinks he is slowly going insane.

The Earth spirit first sent Black Crow to challenge Captain America to a trial by combat because, as a symbol of modern America, Captain America must perish to appease the spirit. After a well-fought battle, Captain America made a gesture of appeasement to the Earth spirit. This ended the conflict and created a spiritual bond between the two American heroes.

Some weeks later, Black Crow appeared at Captain America's bedside. Captain America had been poisoned by the Red Skull and was on the brink of death. Black Crow enhanced Captain America's will to live, and the poison burned out of his system. Months later, the Earth spirit sent Black Crow to observe Daredevil who was to meet with a mysterious danger that never materialized.

Much later, Black Crow battled the malevolent Native American spirit, the Cat, in Yosemite National Park, but neither could defeat the other. The Avenger Hawkeye travelled to Yosemite to train but was unable due to the Cat's influence. Black Crow told the Avenger that he was chosen to defeat the Cat. At first, Hawkeye disagreed, but finally agreed and defeated the Cat with Black Crow's help.

Black Crow later assisted Red Wolf and Doctor Strange in rescuing Red Wolf's mentor, Owayodata, who had been taken hostage by a trio of other Native American gods, Calumet, Nanabozho, and Hotamitanio.

Sometime later, Black Crow inserted himself into a conflict between Spider-Man and the Puma. He put Spider-Man and Puma through a mystical experience to resolve their differences and then removed Puma's knowledge of Spider-Man's secret identity. Soon after this, Black Crow is attacked by the demon D'Spayre. D'Spayre hopes to defeat Black Crow by weakening his host body. But Black Crow reveals himself as real to Jesse for a moment, showing Jesse that he is not insane and that the spiritual teachings from his great-grandfather were real. Jesse is strengthened by this vision, and no longer weakened by the attack on Jesse, Black Crow defeats D'Spayre. Black Crow leaves Jesse with the message that he will soon be ready.

In his last known appearance, Black Crow appeared to Captain America telling him that he was going to die within 24 hours.

Civil War/The Initiative
After the passing of SHRA he was arrested and sent to prison "42". In the Civil War tie-in War Crimes, it was revealed that Black Crow was apprehended after a 12-hour standoff with S.H.I.E.L.D. He was among the many prisoners who escaped during the massive breakout arranged by Captain America.

Jesse was being considered as a "potential recruit" for the Initiative program.

Powers and abilities
Normally, Jesse Black Crow is paralyzed from the waist down and uses a wheelchair. He has the ability to undergo a mystical transformation into the Black Crow courtesy of an "Earth Mother" spirit once worshiped by his Navajo ancestors.

In his form as Black Crow, he has superhuman strength, stamina, durability, agility and reflexes, and is a gifted unarmed combatant. He can mystically summon fog and mist and has shape-shifting powers. His two most well-known forms are that of a crow or a bolt of lightning, but he has apparently also transformed himself into mist, and assumed the forms of Spider-Man, the Puma, an actual puma, and a gigantic crow. He retains his human intelligence in any form and can speak in animal form.

Black Crow can also apparently mystically transport himself and others into the other-dimensional land of the Anasazi of Native American myth.

Black Crow has proven capable of communicating telepathically with Captain America, paralyzing a person through mystic hypnosis, and removing specific memories from a person's mind. He possesses mystic senses that are attuned to the spirits of mortal Native Americans and to their deities. He can sense the auras of other Native Americans and thereby learn about their recent past.

He appears capable of creating visions and illusions in the minds of others, leading to speculation that some of the above-mentioned feats may have been illusions as well.

He carries a spear, which he spins to perform certain mystic feats such as cleansing negative magical energies. He also carries an ordinary longbow, arrows, and knife. He wears a pouch containing mystic herbs he can employ for various purposes, involving his knowledge of mystic rituals.

He also uses "freezing mist" that can paralyze other people and blank their minds for brief periods of time.

References

External links
 

Characters created by J. M. DeMatteis
Characters created by Paul Neary
Comics characters introduced in 1984
Fictional characters from New Mexico
Fictional characters with superhuman durability or invulnerability
Fictional Navajo people
Marvel Comics characters who use magic
Marvel Comics characters with superhuman senses
Marvel Comics characters with superhuman strength
Marvel Comics superheroes